FabricLive.65 is a 2012 DJ mix album by DJ Hazard. The album was released as part of the FabricLive Mix Series.

Track list

References

Fabric (club) albums
2012 compilation albums